Guido Andreozzi and Marcel Felder won the title, defeating 1st seeds Rodrigo Grilli and André Miele 6–3, 6–3 in the final.

Seeds

Draw

Draw

References
 Main Draw

Recife Open Internacional de Tenis - Doubles